The superior cerebellar artery (SCA) is an artery of the head. It arises near the end of the basilar artery. It is a branch of the basilar artery. It supplies parts of the cerebellum, the midbrain, and other nearby structures. It is the cause of trigeminal neuralgia in some patients.

Structure 
The superior cerebellar artery arises near the end of the basilar artery. It passes laterally around the brainstem. This is immediately below the oculomotor nerve, which separates it from the posterior cerebral artery. It then winds around the cerebral peduncle, close to the trochlear nerve. It also lies close to the cerebellar tentorium. When it arrives at the upper surface of the cerebellum, it divides into branches which ramify in the pia mater and anastomose with those of the anterior inferior cerebellar arteries and the posterior inferior cerebellar arteries.

Several branches are given to the pineal body, the anterior medullary velum, and the tela chorioidea of the third ventricle.

Function 

The superior cerebellar artery supplies deep parts and superior parts of the cerebellum. It supplies parts of the midbrain (tectum, including the cerebral crus). It also supplies superior medullary velum, the superior cerebellar peduncle, the middle cerebellar peduncle, and the interpeduncular region.

Clinical significance

Trigeminal neuralgia 
The superior cerebellar artery is frequently the cause of trigeminal neuralgia. It compresses the trigeminal nerve (CN V), causing pain on the patient's face (the distribution of the nerve). This may be treated with vascular microsurgery to decompress the trigeminal nerve. At autopsy, 50% of people without trigeminal neuralgia will also be noted to have vascular compression of the nerve.

Stroke 
An infarction of the superior cerebellar artery can cause a cerebellar stroke. This can cause a headache and ataxia (with problems walking).

See also 

 Posterior cerebral artery

References 

Handbook of Neurosurgery, Greenberg, M.D., Thieme 2006

External links 
 
 http://neuroangio.org/anatomy-and-variants/superior-cerebellar-artery/
 

Arteries of the head and neck